Two ships operated by Achille Lauro were named Gioacchino Lauro:

, in service 1932–40
, in service 1947–68

Ship names